The  was an infantry division of the Imperial Japanese Army. It was formed on 15 May 1938 in Kyoto as a B-class square division, simultaneously with the 106th Division. The nucleus for the formation was the 16th Division headquarters. The division was originally subordinated to the Central China Expeditionary Army.

Action
The division landed in Shanghai on 24 June 1938, and was immediately sent to the Dabie Mountains and Battle of Wuhan through Anqing. From March 1939, a small part of the division participated in the Battle of Nanchang. After the Central China Expeditionary Army was abolished, the division was reassigned to Thirteenth Army.

In the aftermath of the Doolittle Raid 18 April 1942, the unit participated in the Zhejiang-Jiangxi campaign. In December 1942, the 138th Infantry Regiment was transferred to the 31st Division, therefore the 116th division became a triangular division.

In November 1943, the division fought in the Battle of Changde, and from May 1944 - in the Battle of Changsha (1944).

In October 1944, it was transferred to Twentieth Army and take a part in the Defense of Hengyang as a part of Operation Ichi-Go. During the intensive 40-day assault of Chinese positions, the division has suffered major losses but was able to capture the city. From March 1945, it also participated in the Battle of West Henan–North Hubei with the help of the newly created 86th Independent Mixed Brigade. By the day of the surrender of Japan on 15 August 1945, the division was still in Hengyang.

See also
 List of Japanese Infantry Divisions

Notes
This article incorporates material from Japanese Wikipedia page 第116師団 (日本軍), accessed 17 June 2016

References
 Madej, W. Victor, Japanese Armed Forces Order of Battle, 1937-1945 [2 vols], Allentown, PA: 1981.

Japanese World War II divisions
Infantry divisions of Japan
Military units and formations established in 1938
Military units and formations disestablished in 1945
1938 establishments in Japan
1945 disestablishments in Japan